Touzani is a Moroccan surname. Notable people with the surname include:

 Karim Touzani (born 1980), Dutch retired footballer of Moroccan descent
 Soufiane Touzani (born 1986), Dutch-Moroccan freestyle footballer and television host, brother of Karim